In Greek mythology, according to Plutarch, the 7th century BC Greek poet Alcman said that Ersa  or Herse  (literally "dew"), the personification of dew, is the daughter of Zeus and the Moon (Selene). Plutarch writes:

Notes

References
 Campbell, David A., Greek Lyric, Volume I: Sappho and Alcaeus,  Loeb Classical Library No. 142, Cambridge, Massachusetts, Harvard University Press, 1990. . Online version at Harvard University Press.
 Hard, Robin, The Routledge Handbook of Greek Mythology: Based on H.J. Rose's "Handbook of Greek Mythology", Psychology Press, 2004, .
 Keightley, Thomas, The Mythology of Ancient Greece and Italy, G. Bell and Sons, 1877.
 ní Mheallaigh, Karen, The Moon in the Greek and Roman Imagination: Myth, Literature, Science and Philosophy, Cambridge University Press, 2020. .
 Plutarch, Moralia. 16 vols. (vol. 13: 13.1 & 13.2, vol. 16: index), transl. by Frank Cole Babbitt (vol. 1–5) et al., series: "Loeb Classical Library" (LCL, vols. 197–499). Cambridge, Massachusetts: Harvard University Press et al., 1927–2004.

External links
 

Greek goddesses
Children of Zeus
Lunar goddesses
Children of Selene